This is a list of awards and nominations received by Nigerian singer and songwriter, Tems. Considered one of the most critically acclaimed African artistes, Tems was honored with the Prize for Music at The Future Awards Africa and the Impact Award at the BMI London Awards in recognition of her "ground-breaking artistry, creative vision and impact on the future of music".

In 2020, Tems published her debut album For Broken Ears, promoted by the song "Damages". The album was nominated for awards at the All Africa Music Awards and The Beatz Awards. Then she collaborated in Wizkid's "Essence", received critical support, being nominated for the Grammy Award for Best Global Music Performance. The song also won severals awards at the BET Awards, NAACP Image Awards, The Headies Awards and at the Soul Train Music Awards.

In 2021 Tems publisched her second studio album If Orange Was a Place, which won The Headies for Best R&B Album. She was featured in "Wait for U" with Future and Drake, which was nominated for the Grammy Award for Best Rap Song and won the Best Melodic Rap Performance, an American Music Awards and a BET Hip Hop Awards. In 2022 Tems contributed to Beyoncé's seventh studio album Renaissance on the track "Move", receiving nominations at the NAACP Image Awards and Soul Train Music Awards.

Tems worked with Ludwig Göransson, Ryan Coogler and Rihanna to score Black Panther: Wakanda Forever Soundtrack, co-writing "Lift Me Up", the film's original song performed by Rihanna. The song was nominated at the Academy Award for Best Original Song, earning the same nominations at the Golden Globe Awards, Critics' Choice Awards and Satellite Awards. She also performed "No Woman No Cry" for the soundtrack, receiving the nominations at the All Africa Music Awards and NAACP Image Awards.

Awards and nominations

References

External links
 

Lists of awards received by Nigerian musician